San Vitero is a municipality located in the province of Zamora, Castile and León, Spain. According to the 2004 census (INE), the municipality has a population of 677 inhabitants.

Town hall
San Vitero is home to the town hall of 5 villages:
San Vitero (241 inhabitants, INE 2020).
San Juan del Rebollar (157 inhabitants, INE 2020).
El Poyo (57 inhabitants, INE 2020).
San Cristóbal de Aliste (30 inhabitants, INE 2020).
Villarino de Cebal (7 inhabitants, INE 2020).

References

Municipalities of the Province of Zamora
Portugal–Spain border crossings